The 1959 European Ladies' Team Championship took place 15–20 September on the Golf und Land Club Köln outside Cologne, Germany. It was the first ladies' amateur golf European Ladies' Team Championship.

Venue 
The hosting club was founded in 1906 and the championship 18-hole course, situated 10 kilometres east of the city center of Cologne, opened in 1955. The course set up of par 74 had four par-3-holes, eight par-4-holes and six par-5-holes.

The championship course was set up with par 74.

Format 
All participating teams played two qualification rounds of stroke play, counting the three best scores out of up to four players for each team. The four best teams formed flight A. The next two teams formed flight B.

The winner in each flight was determined by a round-robin system. All teams in the flight met each other and the team with most points for team matches in flight A won the tournament, using the scale, win=2 points, halved=1 point, lose=0 points. In each match between two nation teams, two foursome games and four single games were played.

Teams 
Six nation teams contested the event. Each team consisted of a minimum of four players.

Players in some of the teams

* Note: Playing captain Lally de Saint-Sauveur did not play the qualification round and played one single game and two foursome games in flight A.

Other participating teams

Winners 
Individual winner in the opening 36-hole stroke play qualifying competition was Odile Garaialde Semelaigne, France, with a score of 5-under-par 143.

Team France won the championship, earning 6 points in flight A.

Results
Qualification rounds

Team standings

Individual leader

 Note: There was no official recognition for the lowest individual score.

Flight A

Team matches

Team standings

Flight B

Team match

Team standings

Final standings

Sources:

See also
Espirito Santo Trophy – biennial world amateur team golf championship for women organized by the International Golf Federation.
European Amateur Team Championship – European amateur team golf championship for men organised by the European Golf Association.

References

External links
European Golf Association: Results

European Ladies' Team Championship
Golf tournaments in Germany
European Ladies' Team Championship
European Ladies' Team Championship
European Ladies' Team Championship